Laman, Azerbaijan may refer to:
Laman, Khachmaz
Laman, Lerik